These are the official results of the Men's javelin throw event (old design) at the 1982 European Championships in Athens, Greece. There were a total number of 21 competitors. The final was held on 7 September 1982. The qualification mark was set at 80.00 metres.

Medalists

Schedule
All times are Eastern European Time (UTC+2)

Competitors
European list as of September 5, 1982, just before the start of the competition

Records

Qualification
Q = automatic qualification; q = qualified by rank; DNS = did not start; NM = no mark; WR = world record; AR = area record; NR = national record; PB = personal best; SB = season best

Group A

Group B

Final

Participation
According to an unofficial count, 21 athletes from 12 countries participated in the event.

 (1)
 (1)
 (2)
 (3)
 (1)
 (1)
 (2)
 (1)
 (3)
 (3)
 (2)
 (1)

See also
 1980 Men's Olympic Javelin Throw (Moscow)
 1983 Men's World Championships Javelin Throw (Helsinki)
 1984 Men's Olympic Javelin Throw (Los Angeles)
 1987 Men's World Championships Javelin Throw (Rome)
 1988 Men's Olympic Javelin Throw (Seoul)

References

 Results

Javelin throw
Javelin throw at the European Athletics Championships